The Chinese Taipei women's national football team represents Taiwan (the Republic of China) in international women's football and is controlled by the Chinese Taipei Football Association, the governing body for football in Taiwan.

Team image

Nicknames
The Chinese Taipei women's national football team has been known or nicknamed as "Mulan". The nickname was adopted by the national federation during the tenure of then-chairman General Cheng Wei-yuan in 1975 after the Chinese folk heroine Hua Mulan. After the CTFA adopted a new logo featuring a Formosan blue magpie in the 2010s, the Blue Magpies has also been used as an unofficial moniker.

Kits and crest

FIFA World Ranking
, after the match against .

 Best Ranking   Best Mover   Worst Ranking   Worst Mover

Results and fixtures

The following is a list of match results in the last 12 months, as well as any future matches that have been scheduled.

Legend

2022

2023

 Chinese Taipei Fixtures and Results – Soccerway.com

All-time results

 The following table shows Chinese Taipei women's all-time international record, correct as of 1 Oct 2022.

Source: Worldfootball.net

Coaching staff

Current coaching staff

Manager history

 Chang Teng-yun (張騰雲), (1979)
 Liu Jun-tse (劉潤澤), (1977)
 Kao Yong (高庸), (1981, 1993, 1995–1998)
 Chong Tsu-pin (張子濱), (1990–1991)
 Chen Ting-hsiung (陳定雄), (1990)
 Hsieh Chih-chun (謝志君), (1994)
 Chang Ming-hsien (張明賢), (1999–2002)
 Lu Kuei-hua (呂桂花), (2003–2005, 2008)
 Chou Tai-ying (周台英), (2005–2006, 2010)
 Toshiaki Imai (今井敏明), (2007)
 Yen Shih-kai (顏士凱), (2012–2013, 2018)
 Masayuki Nagira (柳樂雅幸), (2013–2017)
 Kazuo Echigo (越後和男), (2019–2022)
  Yen Shih-kai (顏士凱), (2022–)

Players

Current squad

The following players were lineups for 2023 FIFA WWC qualification (inter-confederation play-offs).

Caps and goals as of 19 February 2023 after match against .

Recent call-ups
The following players have been called up to the squad in the past 12 months.

Notable players
Chou Tai-ying (周台英)
Sheih Su-jean
Hsu Chia-cheng

Records

*Active players in bold, statistics as of 1 October 2021.

Most capped players

Top goalscorers

Honours

Continental
AFC Women's Asian Cup
 Champions: 1977, 1980, 1981
 Runners-up: 1989, 1999

OFC Women's Championship
 Champions: 1986, 1989

Others
AFF Women's Championship
 Runners-up: 2006

Competitive record

FIFA Women's World Cup

Olympic Games

AFC Women's Asian Cup

*Draws include knockout matches decided on penalty kicks.

OFC Women's Nations Cup

Asian Games

EAFF E-1 Football Championship

AFF Women's Championship

See also
 Sport in Taiwan
 Football in Taiwan
 Women's football in Taiwan
 Chinese Taipei women's national under-20 football team
 Chinese Taipei women's national under-17 football team
 Chinese Taipei women's national futsal team
 Chinese Taipei men's national football team

References

External links

Official website 
FIFA profile 

 
Asian women's national association football teams